The mountain yellow-legged frog (Rana muscosa), also known as the southern mountain yellow-legged frog, is a species of true frog endemic to California in the United States. It occurs in the San Jacinto Mountains, San Bernardino Mountains, and San Gabriel Mountains in Southern California and the Southern Sierra Nevada. It is a federally listed endangered species.

Populations formerly classified as Rana muscosa in the northern Sierra Nevada have since been redescribed as a new species: Rana sierrae, the Sierra Nevada yellow-legged frog. The Sierra Nevada yellow-legged frog has also been classified as an endangered species since 2013. The mountains separating the headwaters of the South Fork and Middle Fork of the Kings River mark the boundary between the ranges of the two species.

Description

Rana muscosa is 4 to 8.9 centimeters long. Females tend to be larger than males. Its color and patterning are variable. It is yellowish, brownish, or olive with black and brown markings. The underside of its hind legs can be different hues of yellow, from a bold sun yellow to a lighter pale yellow; larger ones may can hints of orange on their hind legs. The throats of it range from white to yellow. Along with its variable coloration, the frog also has a dorsal pattern with dark spots in different shapes and sizes. Its species name muscosa is from the Latin meaning "mossy" or "full of moss", inspired by its coloration. It may have light orange or yellow thighs. When handled, the frog emits a defensive odor reminiscent of garlic.

Habitat
The frog occurs in mountain creeks, lakes and lakeshores, streams, and pools, preferring sunny areas. It rarely strays far from water, and can remain underwater for a very long time, likely through cutaneous gas exchange. As such, adults can be found on rocks around shorelines. Close proximity to water is important because eggs are either laid underwater attached to rocks or in shallow waters. The tadpoles require a permanent water habitat for at least two years while they develop. This is because tadpoles can die from a lack of moisture, especially dry summers. The frog has been noted at elevations of between about 1,214 and 7,546 feet (370 and 2,300 meters) in Southern California. These habitats are primarily found in north of California in Sierra Nevada and south of California in the Transverse ranges.

Reproduction and early life

The frog emerges from its wintering site soon after snowmelt. Its breeding season begins once the highest meltwater flow is over, around March through May in the southern part of its range, and up to July in higher mountains to the north. Fertilization is external, and the egg cluster is secured to vegetation in a current, or in still waters sometimes left floating free. How long it takes for breeding onset varies from 1-4 years depending on the levels of snow and temperature. Very cold temperatures may cause death of larvae. The juvenile may be a tadpole for 3 to 4 years before undergoing metamorphosis. However, this rate heavily varies depending on the temperature and elevation of the area. There are two classes of tadpoles: first year tadpoles and second year tadpoles. Metamorphosis tends to happen the second summer of tadpole life. They are called metamorphs when this transition from tadpole to young frog is occurring. They are then called a juvenile when it survives one winter. It becomes ready to reproduce after 2 years of the juvenile stage. It is found that the growth and development rate is slower at higher elevations.

Behavior
The frog lacks a vocal sac. Its call is raspy, rising at the end. During the day, it calls underwater. The frogs tend to be less active during the winters and more active during the mating season. For years when there is heavy snow at high elevations, they may only be active for 90 days in the summer. Hibernation tends to happen underwater or in the crevices of stream banks. This occurs during the cold months of winter. Hibernation ends in the spring to start the breeding season. This species feeds on aquatic insects and benthic invertebrates. Their diet varies depending on the habitat type. When living in streams, it tends to eat terrestrial insects such as beetles, ants, bees, wasps, flies, and dragonflies. They are also known to eat larvae of other frogs and toads, as well as commit cannibalism.

Decline

Once a common species, Rana muscosa was absent from much of its native range by the 1970s. Over the course of the last hundred years, 90% of its populations have been eliminated. The frog was known from 166 locations in the Southern California mountains, and as of 2007, only seven or eight remained. The 2009 discovery of R. muscosa at two locations in the San Bernardino National Forest was newsworthy. The frog is represented in the Sierra Nevada by three or four populations. Its decline is attributed to many factors, including introduced species of fish such as trout, livestock grazing, chytrid fungus, and probably pesticides, drought, and ultraviolet radiation. Recreational activities in streams have also had an impact.

Introduced fish species
Trout were introduced to lakes and streams throughout the Sierra Nevada in the late 1800s to increase recreational fishing in the area. 90% of these Sierra Nevada lakes and streams did not previously have fish in them, although the trout were regionally present. The fish feed on tadpoles, a main prey item. The fish feed on tadpoles, a main prey item. Some of these fish types that prey on tadpoles include the brown, golden, and rainbow trout, as well as the brook char. The introduced trout have changed the distribution of several native species in the local ecosystems. Most of the mountain yellow-legged frog populations did not evolve to adapt to the trout. The trout caused populations to isolate, restricted the amount of available habitats, and increased the chances of extinction. After the removal of fish from several lakes, the frog reappeared and its populations increased. These frogs then began to disperse to other suitable habitats nearby.

Pesticides
The decline of the frog from its historic range has been associated with pesticide drift from agricultural areas. Frogs that have been reintroduced to water bodies cleared of fish have failed to survive, and analysis has isolated pesticides in their tissues. Pesticides are considered by some authorities to be a greater threat to the frog than the trout. The relative roles that pesticides and introduced fish play in frog declines are still debated, and the loss of R. muscosa in its former range has probably been influenced by multiple factors.

Chytridiomycosis

This species is one of many amphibians affected by the fungal disease chytridiomycosis. Ample research has explored the biology of the fungus and how to prevent related amphibian declines. The fungus attacks keratinized areas of a frog's body. Tadpoles are not severely affected because only their jaw sheaths and tooth rows are heavily keratinized. Infection in a tadpole can be identified by changes in the pigmentation of these parts. Adults have keratin-rich skin and suffer worse infections.

In studies, healthy adult frogs exposed to infected frogs for at least two weeks developed the disease. Transmission takes longer in tadpoles, generally over seven weeks. Frogs may be predisposed to infection if their immune systems are weakened by other factors, such as pesticide. Studies indicate that R. muscosa is naturally more susceptible to the chytrid fungus than many other frogs.

Conservation status and efforts
The frog is an endangered species under the US Endangered Species Act. The International Union for Conservation of Nature has also listed it as endangered. Its NatureServe conservation status is Imperiled.

The first successful captive breeding of the frog occurred in 2009 when three tadpoles were reared at the San Diego Zoo. Conservation workers at the zoo plan to release any more surviving captive-bred frogs in the San Jacinto Mountains, part of their native range.

In 2015 frogs and tadpoles of the species were reintroduced to Fuller Mill Creek in the San Bernardino Mountains and San Bernardino National Forest.  They were bred and raised the Arnold and Mabel Beckman Center for Conservation Research in Escondido, one of the organizations that have partnered with the San Diego Zoo Institute for Conservation Research (ICR) to save the species from extinction. The Los Angeles Zoo is also a coalition partner and is raising two groups of wild collected tadpoles from two localities in the San Gabriel Mountains where they are released when ready.

In 2015, the Oakland Zoo began a rehabilitation project of the frog in order to fuel efforts to save the species. Every year, a group of tadpoles are taken from native lakes throughout California and brought to the zoo. There, the tadpoles are grown to juvenile frogs, while also undergoing an inoculation process to render them immune to the chytridiomycosis fungus disease. Once ready, the now chytrid immune juvenile frogs are released back into the lakes they were found. In 2016, the Oakland Zoo released 53 specimens into various lakes in Sequoia and Kings Canyon National Parks. The program is set to release 130 inoculated individuals into lakes in Sequoia and Kings Canyon National Parks and Inyo National Forest in 2017.

In 2021, the Aquarium of the Pacific partnered with government organizations like the California Department of Fish and Wildlife to create a facility for taking care of mountain yellow-legged frogs. This was in response to recent wildfires which harmed their habitats. Following the wildfires, wildlife agencies found and moved these frogs into places like the facility established by the Aquarium of the Pacific. These efforts help the species recover from natural disasters and prevent extinction.

References

Further reading
Adams, M. J., et al. (2005). Distribution patterns of lentic-breeding amphibians in relation to ultraviolet radiation exposure in western North America. Ecosystems 8(5):488-500.
Bridges, C. M. and M. D. Boone. (2003). The interactive effects of UV-B and insecticide exposure on tadpole survival, growth and development. Biological Conservation 113(1):49-54.
Briggs, C. J., et al. (2005). Investigating the population-level effects of chytridiomycosis: an emerging infectious disease of amphibians. Ecology 86(12):3149-59.
Funk, W. C. and W. W. Dunlap. (1999). Colonization of high-elevation lakes by long-toed salamanders (Ambystoma macrodactylum) after the extinction of introduced trout populations. Canadian Journal of Zoology 77(11):1759-67. (abstract)
Hillis, D. M. and T. P. Wilcox. (2005). Phylogeny of the New World true frogs (Rana). Molecular Phylogenetics and Evolution 34(2):299-314.
Hillis, D. M. (2007). Constraints in naming parts of the Tree of Life. Molecular Phylogenetics and Evolution 42(2):331-38.
Knapp, R. A. and K. R. Matthews. (2000). Non-native fish introductions and the decline of the mountain yellow-legged frog from within protected areas. Conservation Biology 14(2), 428-38.
Pister, E. P. (2001). Wilderness fish stocking: history and perspective. Ecosystems 4(4):279-86.
Stuart, S. N., et al. (2004). Status and trends of amphibian declines and extinctions worldwide. Science 306(5702):1783-86.
Vredenburg, V. T., et al. (2007). Concordant molecular and phenotypic data delineate new taxonomy and conservation priorities for the endangered mountain yellow-legged frog (Ranidae: Rana muscosa). Journal of Zoology 271:361-74.

External links

Fisher, R. N. and T. J. Case. (2003). Rana muscosa, A Field Guide to the Reptiles and Amphibians of Coastal Southern California. USGS.
The Mountain Yellow-legged Frog Site. 
Rana muscosa, AmphibiaWeb.
Rana muscosa vocalizations, Western Soundscape Archive.
Mountain Yellow Legged Frog Release

Rana (genus)
Amphibians of the United States
Endemic fauna of California
Fauna of the Sierra Nevada (United States)
Natural history of the Peninsular Ranges
Natural history of the Transverse Ranges
Endangered fauna of California
ESA endangered species
Amphibians described in 1917